Leong Po-Chih (born 31 December 1939) is a British-Chinese film director. He has worked in England, Hong Kong, and the United States.

Early life
On 31 December 1939, Leong was born in England to parents from Taishan, Guangdong. His father was a seaman who opened a Chinese restaurant in London's West End. Leong has two siblings; his younger brother is sculptor Po Shun Leong, and his nephew is photographer Sze Tsung Leong.

Leong attended Leighton Park School. He graduated with a Bachelor of Arts in Philosophy from the University of Exeter and studied at the London Film School.

Career 
Leong began his career as a trainee film editor at the BBC. Leong worked on a variety of productions, including the long-running series Panorama. In 1967, Leong joined TVB and set up its film unit in British Hong Kong. As an executive producer he also directed a number of entertainment programmes, including The Star Show. He left TVB in 1969 to form Adpower, one of the first commercial production companies in Hong Kong.

In 1976, Leong co-directed his first Hong Kong film Jumping Ash, an action film set in a drug underworld, where he also appeared in this film as Tiger's man. It was one of the two top-grossing films of the season. At the 23rd Hong Kong Film Festival, it was described as "the advance guard of the (Hong Kong) New Wave". He went on to direct a range of genres from drama to action movies, comedies, horror and satire, in both English and Chinese. Banana Cop (1984) was the story of a British–Chinese policeman who returns to Hong Kong to seek help with a case. It was the genesis for his first British film Ping Pong (1986), made for UK's Channel 4, the first English feature film set in Soho's Chinatown.

After Banana Cop, Leong turned to history for inspiration and made the award-winning movie Hong Kong 1941 (1984), starring Chow Yun Fat, set in Hong Kong during the early days of the Japanese invasion. Hong Kong 1941 was an oblique comment on the 1984 deal between Britain and China about Hong Kong's future. Leong and his film maker daughter, Sze Wing Leong, directed and filmed the effect of this deal up to and beyond the handover in Riding the Tiger (1997-1998), an eight part, observational documentary series for the UK's Channel 4.

Further pursuing his interest in history, Leong made a Hong Kong English-language movie, Shanghai 1920 (HK, 1990), set in Shanghai and starring John Lone, about the rise of the legendary Shanghai gangster Big-Eared Du.

His second British feature film, was the award-winning 1998 movie, The Wisdom of Crocodiles, starring Jude Law, Timothy Spall, and Kerry Fox, with notable references to Akira Kurosawas opus, especially Rashomon, and to Jean-Pierre Melville's Le Samouraï. In recent years Leong has made action films starring Steven Seagal, Wesley Snipes, Judd Nelson, Joe Mantegna, and Oscar-winning Marcia Gay Harden. He has directed films for US network television and AMC. In 2012, he reunited with Hong Kong producer Raymond Wong Bak Ming to direct the 3D movie, Baby Blues.

Personal life
Leong is married to Mary Leong. His son James Leong is also a filmmaker.

Filmography

Films

Television series

Awards
His movies have won multiple awards and have been shown at the Venice, London, Toronto, Locarno, Hong Kong and Edinburgh film festivals, amongst others.

References

External links 

Living people
1939 births
Alumni of the London Film School
Alumni of the University of Exeter
British film directors
English people of Chinese descent
People educated at Leighton Park School
People from Northampton